ARX (Algorithmic Research Ltd.) is a digital security company headquartered in San Francisco, CA, with offices in the UK, the Netherlands, Australia and Israel. It is the creator of CoSign by ARX, a digital signature technology, along with related digital signature security technology products. ARX was acquired by DocuSign in May 2015. The acquisition builds on a three-year business partnership between DocuSign and ARX, bringing together ARX's CoSign digital signature technology with DocuSign's Digital Transaction Management (DTM) platform and broadens The DocuSign Global Trust Network.

The ARX digital signature products are based on public key infrastructure (PKI) technology, with the digital signatures resulting from a cryptographic operation that creates a ‘fingerprint’ unique to both the signer and the content, so that they cannot be copied, forged or tampered with. This process provides proof of signer identity, data integrity and the non-repudiation of signed documents, all of which can be verified without the need for proprietary verification software.

The company's CoSign solution integrates into a large range of document management and workflow automation systems and is intended to streamline workflow processes requiring signatures. ARX partners with document management and workflow solution providers including SharePoint, OpenText, Oracle, Alfresco, Nintex and K2.

Industries of focus include life science (particularly research and clinical trials), engineering, legal and federal/local governments. ARX clients are based in North America, Africa, Europe and Asia-Pacific. In Italy, CoSign is used by the Ministry of Defence, RAI, Senate, Court of Accounts, State Police and Bank of Italy. It is also used by the European Court of Human Rights to digitize and streamline their application process.

ARX solutions have been validated for security standards such as NIST FIPS 140-2 level 3, FIPS 186 and ETSI TS 101 733. In 2013, CoSign was named “the strongest digital signature solution” in the 2013 report. In August 2014, CoSign received Common Criteria EAL4+ certification, thus becoming the first remote / server-side digital signature solution to be fully compliant with the EU's newly enacted Electronic Identification and Trust Services regulation for Electronic Transactions in the Internal Market (eIDAS). ARX solutions also comply with ESIGN, UETA, FDA 21 CFR Part 11, SOX, HIPAA, USDA, among many other signature-related country- and industry-specific laws and regulations.

History
ARX was founded in 1987 by Prof. Amos Fiat and Yossi Tulpan and focused on developing encryption-based products, which included an RSA-smartcard developed for Canal+ in 1989, a secure-PIN entry keyboard connected smartcard reader, cryptographic toolkits, a network-attached cryptographic server (HSM), and a VPN. In September 1997 ARX was acquired by Cylink Corp (NASDAQ:CYLK) from Sunnyvale, California.

In 2001 the company went through a management buy-out (MBO) initiated by Dr. Gadi Aharoni. Dr. Aharoni served as the President and CEO of ARX for 14 years, and under his leadership the company gradually switched to focus on its newly developed CoSign Digital-Signature solution. In May 2015, ARX was acquired by its U.S. competitor DocuSign.

References

External links
 What is the eIDAS Regulation

Companies based in San Francisco
Computer security companies